Heinz Günthardt and Bob Hewitt were the defending champions, but did not participate this year.

David Carter and Paul Kronk won the title, defeating Eric Fromm and Shlomo Glickstein 6–3, 6–4 in the final.

Seeds

  Andrew Pattison /  Butch Walts (quarterfinals)
  Steve Denton /  Eddie Edwards (quarterfinals)
  Rod Frawley /  Chris Lewis (semifinals)
  David Carter /  Paul Kronk (champions)

Draw

Draw

External links
Draw

1981 Grand Prix (tennis)
1981 BMW Open